Khairul Azwan bin Harun (Jawi: خيرالعزوان بن هارون; born 19 October 1976) is a Malaysian politician. He is a former Malaysian Senator which is part of the Dewan Negara. He is a member of the United Malays National Organisation (UMNO), a major party in the Barisan Nasional (BN) coalition. Azwan is one of the individuals mentioned during the press conference by the Malaysian Anti-Corruption Commission on 8 January 2020 with regards to audio recordings of telephone conversations relating to the 1Malaysia Development Berhad scandal.

Azwan has been vocal in championing the issues related to youth and the future generations of Malaysia. His progressive political views can be seen through various initiatives that he brought forward including supporting English medium school, organising interfaith dialogue, and becoming the chairman for Kuala Lumpur International Youth Discourse (KLIYD). He was the chairman for KLIYD for 2 consecutive years.

Since 23 October 2013, he has been the Deputy Leader of UMNO Youth Wing and a member of UMNO Supreme Council chaired by the Party President. He won the post in the national party election with Khairy Jamaluddin who won the post of National Leader of UMNO Youth Wing. Prior to this, Azwan was the Leader of Barisan Nasional Perak Youth (the youth organisation of Malaysia's governing coalition), and the Head of the Perak State UMNO Youth Wing. At UMNO's grassroots level, he has held the post of Youth Chief for the Pasir Salak Division.

Personal background
Azwan had his tertiary education at the International Islamic University Matriculation Kuala Lumpur, and his university education at Cardiff University of Wales in the United Kingdom and Open University Malaysia in the Kuala Lumpur. While at Cardiff, he graduated with a Bachelor degree in Accounting in 1999. In 2007 he completed his Master degree in Management at Open University Malaysia. Azwan also successfully completed Leaders in Development Executive Course from Harvard Kennedy School, USA in 2014.

After leaving university, Azwan started his career in 1999 with Ernst & Young, Chartered Accountants at Kuala Lumpur Office and held senior positions in Business Assurance and Corporate Recovery divisions. He was involved in Ernst & Young corporate advisory assignments at several public listed companies and GLC.

Career Progress
Azwan started his career in 1999 with Ernst & Young, Chartered Accountants at Kuala Lumpur Office and held senior positions in Business Assurance and Corporate Recovery divisions. He was involved in Ernst & Young corporate advisory assignments at several public listed companies and GLCs. He joined Perak State Government in 2004 and was appointed as CEO of Yayasan Bina Upaya Darul Ridzuan (YBUDR), a state charity foundation in 2010 until 2011. He is also an adjunct Lecturer of Management and Leadership at PETRONAS University of Technology.

Azwan had also served as Chief of Staff at Perak Chief Minister's Office in 2009 until January 2010. After having served YBUDR as its founding CEO, Khairul Azwan has built his own corporate flagship namely Great Colour Group and continues to grow his group's business interest in energy, marine engineering, pharmaceutical and ICT.

In sports, Azwan was the Deputy President of Perak Football Association and was Perak State Super League Team Manager from 2011 until 2013.

Political Views 
Throughout his political career, Azwan stands out as a progressive, moderate and no-holds barred youth leader. He upheld the principle of Wasattiyah (Moderation) as promoted by the Prime Minister Dato' Sri Najib Tun Razak. He is known for speaking his mind. In his engagement programs with the youth throughout Malaysia, he has been vocal in championing issues pertinent to the Malaysian youth. In the most recent years, Azwan has urged for greater efforts to upskill convicted drug addicts to ensure they can integrate back into society. Azwan has also voiced his concern on issues of religious extremism, climate change, sustainable energy and the need to prepare the youth for the jobs of the future.

Azwan writes constantly on the need for the youth to be attentive to the politics governing their nation. In an article in the New Straits Times, Azwan said: "For as much as you can express your wants and opinions, you must also listen to others and follow the traditions set to make sure everyone gets a fair chance. Frustrations of not seeing your particular ideals met should not warrant you to burn the bridge of this vital cooperation. What the youth must comprehend and actually guard against is the wrong perception that supporting your party president equates to yes-manning mindlessly. There are values of being apart of a party, values of loyalty and the sincerity of respect to leaders."For Azwan, it matters little what side the youth choose to support. What matters more is the right form of politics, one that is less focused on character attacking and more on substantive factual debate. In this, Azwan has been aggressively vocal in criticizing the opposition for its emotional and sensationalism type politics. In the opposition's Alternative Budget 2018, Azwan spent weeks debunking the promises that the opposition proposed, from the fallacy of its proposition to eradicate all road tolls to eliminating GST. In this sense, Azwan is known to present tough economic ideas in words that the common man would understand.

Azwan has been a stern critic of Mahathir Mohamed for his new role as Malaysia's opposition leader. Tun Dr Mahathir, a former Prime Minister of Malaysia for 22 years and now aged 93, became opposition leader in January 2018. For Azwan, this appointment is detrimental to the progress of youth leaders. He has expressed concern that a man of the past would not comprehend issues such as cyber security, jobs security, climate change and modern religious extremism. As noted by Azwan, having a credible opposition helps keep the government on its toes.

Kuala Lumpur International Youth Discourse 
The Kuala Lumpur International Youth Discourse (KLIYD) is the brainchild of Khairul Azwan. It is a platform for youth to discuss geo-political issues in the focus of sovereignty, security, the cultures and the role of religion. During the discourse, Malaysian and foreign youth will be able to have an exchange of views and opinions with Malaysian policy makers, ministers, industry experts and academician.

KLIYD has succeeded in shaping the youth to discuss important issues concerning them and the nation. During the inception of KLIYD, it focused on empowering youth for a safer and better future. The threat of terrorism and radicalism is seen as one of the most dangerous threat hence it should be tackled by the government.

On the 2nd year, KLIYD emphasised on the importance of total security. Total security means protection from both traditional and non-traditional threat including job security, energy and power security, cyber security and food security. The discourse has created awareness amongst youth on the importance of total security to maintain a stable and prosperous nation. KLIYD is scheduled to become an annual platform for the youth to voice out their views.

Election results

References

External links
 Official website

1976 births
Living people
Malaysian people of Malay descent
Malaysian Muslims
Malaysian accountants
United Malays National Organisation politicians
Members of the Dewan Negara
Alumni of Cardiff University
21st-century Malaysian politicians